is a Japanese professional footballer who plays as a midfielder for Japan Football League club Tiamo Hirakata.

Career statistics
Updated to 8 March 2018.

References

External links

Profile at Vissel Kobe

1983 births
Living people
National Institute of Fitness and Sports in Kanoya alumni
People from Uki, Kumamoto
Association football people from Kumamoto Prefecture
Japanese footballers
J1 League players
J2 League players
Japan Football League players
Vissel Kobe players
Kyoto Sanga FC players
Tegevajaro Miyazaki players
Kamatamare Sanuki players
FC Tiamo Hirakata players
Association football midfielders